Discounted maximum loss, also known as worst-case risk measure, is the present value of the worst-case scenario for a financial portfolio.

In investment, in order to protect the value of an investment, one must consider all possible alternatives to the initial investment. How one does this comes down to personal preference; however, the worst possible alternative is generally considered to be the benchmark against which all other options are measured. The present value of this worst possible outcome is the discounted maximum loss.

Definition
If  is the order statistic the discounted maximum loss is simply , where  is the discount factor.

Given a general probability space , let  be a portfolio with discounted return  for state . Then the discounted maximum loss can be written as  where  denotes the essential infimum.

Properties
 The discounted maximum loss is the expected shortfall at level . It is therefore a coherent risk measure.
 The worst-case risk measure  is the most conservative (normalized) risk measure in the sense that for any risk measure  and any portfolio  then .

Example 
As an example, assume that a portfolio is currently worth 100, and the discount factor is 0.8 (corresponding to an interest rate of 25%):

In this case the maximum loss is from 100 to 20 = 80, so the discounted maximum loss is simply

References 

Financial risk modeling